Şebnem Nehazat Kimyacıoğlu (born June 14, 1983) is a Turkish-American player in the Turkish Women's Basketball Team. She is an alumnus from Pinewood High School in California and graduated from Stanford before returning to Turkey. Şebnem's sister, Yasemin Kimyacıoğlu, is also a star basketball player still attending college at Santa Clara University.

She currently plays for Galatasaray and also played for Beşiktaş Cola Turka.

Stanford  statistics

See also
Turkish women in sports

References

External links
Şebnem's Statistics

1983 births
Living people
American women's basketball players
Basketball players from California
American people of Turkish descent
Beşiktaş women's basketball players
Galatasaray S.K. (women's basketball) players
People from Santa Clara, California
Power forwards (basketball)
Stanford Cardinal women's basketball players
Basketball players at the 2016 Summer Olympics
Olympic basketball players of Turkey